Basketball has been a discipline of the African Games event since the first edition in 1965 in Brazzaville, Republic of the Congo.

Starting at the 2019 event, "regular" 5-on-5 basketball was replaced by 3x3 basketball.

Men's tournaments

Summaries

Participating nations

Medal Table, men's

Women's tournaments

Summaries

Participating nations

Medal Table, women's

Medal table, combined

 DR Congo : ex. Zaire

External links

 Basketball Africa National Teams Archive (todor66.com)

 
All-Africa Games
All-Africa Games
Basketball